Sanshan District is a district of the city of Wuhu, Anhui Province, located on the southern (right) bank of the Yangtze to the southwest of the city center.

Wuhu